Jamuovandu Ngatjizeko (born December 28, 1984 in Omaruru) is a Namibian football midfielder currently playing for African Stars.

Career 
African Stars will put to test their latest arrival in Jamu Ngatjizeko who deserted Civics earlier this season.

International 
He is a member of the Namibia national football team.

External links

FIFA Stats

1984 births
Living people
Namibian men's footballers
Namibian expatriate footballers
Namibia international footballers
2008 Africa Cup of Nations players
Association football midfielders
F.C. Civics Windhoek players
People from Omaruru
African Stars F.C. players
Jomo Cosmos F.C. players
Expatriate soccer players in South Africa
Namibian expatriate sportspeople in South Africa